Dianalund is a railway town, at the Tølløse railway line, on the west central part of the Danish island of Zealand. It has a population of 4,127 (1 January 2022), making it the second largest town in Sorø Municipality.

Dianalund was the municipal seat of the former Dianalund Municipality, until 1 January 2007.

Kolonien Filadelfia, the only epilepsy hospital in Denmark, is located in the town.

References

External links
 
Weather forecast Dianalund, Denmark weather-atlas.com

Cities and towns in Region Zealand